Hyllisia flavicans is a species of beetle in the family Cerambycidae. It was described by Breuning in 1954.

References

flavicans
Beetles described in 1954
Taxa named by Stephan von Breuning (entomologist)